Pauline Byakika–Kibwika (née Pauline Byakika), is a Ugandan specialist physician, internist, epidemiologist, academic and researcher, who serves as an Associate Professor of Medicine at Makerere University College of Health Sciences. From 2017 until 2019, she served as the Vice President of the Uganda Medical Association, a professional industry association, that champions medical doctors' interests in the county.

Background and education
She was born in the Eastern Region of Uganda circa 1973. After attending local schools, she was admitted to the Makerere University, where she studied human medicine. She graduated with a Bachelor of Medicine and Bachelor of Surgery (MBChB) degree in 1999. She followed that with a Master of Medicine (MMed) degree in Internal Medicine, also from Makerere University. Her third degree was a Master of Science (MSc) in Clinical Epidemiology and Biostatistics, obtained from Makerere University. She also holds a Doctor of Philosophy  (PhD) in Clinical Pharmacology obtained from the Trinity College Dublin, in Dublin, Ireland. Her PhD thesis analyses the drug-to-drug interactions between antimalarials and Anti-retroviral drugs.

Career
Byakika started out as a medical officer at Mulago National Referral Hospital and over time rose in status through senior house officer (SHO), registrar and finally consultant in the department of Medicine at the hospital.

She has concurrently taught at Makerere University College of Health Sciences, which uses Mulago Hospital as its teaching hospital. She has risen through the ranks, over the years, from  research associate, assistant lecturer, lecturer, senior lecturer, to her current rank of Associate Professor, as of August 2018. She has also worked at the University's Infectious Diseases Institute.

In 2017, Pauline Byakika, MBChB, MMed (Medicine), MSc, PhD, was elected to serve as the Vice President of the Uganda Medical Association, for the next two years. In addition to her duties, as a member of the nine-person executive committee, she is a member of the 55-person National Governing Council of the Association.

Other considerations
Professor Byakika has authored or co-written over 40 peer-reviewed articles, in the areas of her medical expertise in different medical journals.

See also
 Makerere University School of Medicine
 Mulago Hospital

References

External links
Website of Uganda Medical Association

Living people
1973 births
Ugandan epidemiologists
Makerere University alumni
Alumni of Trinity College Dublin
Academic staff of Makerere University
People from Eastern Region, Uganda
21st-century Ugandan women scientists
21st-century Ugandan scientists
Women epidemiologists